Procaris hawaiana is a species of shrimp in the family Procarididae, from Maui, Hawaii. The species is very similar to Procaris ascensionis from Ascension Island. In P. ascensionis the integument is less firm, the rostrum is shorter, the cervical groove is more distinct, and the third abdominal somite reaches less far posteriorly over the fourth; also the scaphocerite has the final tooth still less distinct than in P. hawaiana, and the last segment of its antennal peduncle is less slender.

Description
The rostrum is short and pointed, it reaches just beyond the eyes. In lateral view it is slender, and tapers regularly towards the tip. In dorsal view it is elongate triangular and its lateral margins merge gradually with the orbital margin. The carapace bears no spines or carinae, only a narrow and shallow cervical groove is visible, which does not reach the dorsum. The abdominal somites are smooth. The first has the pleura large and rounded. The pleura of the second overlap both those of the first and third. The third somite is noticeable in that the posteromedian part is hood-like prolonged posteriorly and reaches beyond the middle of the fourth somite. The fourth somite has the pleura rounded, those of the fifth end in a bluntly rounded top. The sixth somite is approximately 1.5 times as long as the fifth, both its pleura and posterolateral angles are rounded.

The telson is distinctly longer than the sixth abdominal somite. It is elongate triangular and has two pairs of dorsal spines. The posterior margin of the telson is broadly triangular with a blunt top. It bears 4 pairs of spines. Its eyes are broad and have at the inner half of their anterior margin a conical process which is directed forwards and upward and reaches beyond the eye itself. The rest of the eye is broadly and bluntly triangular in dorsal view and bears an irregular pigment spot. Like in P. ascensionis, no distinct corneal elements are visible. The antennula has a large pointed stylocerite, which reaches about to the end of the second segment of the antennular peduncle. Two simple antennular flagella are present, both being very long. The scaphocerite is twice as long as wide.

The mandible consists of a single molar process, which is pointed and has a cutting edge which is dark coloured and shows a few small teeth; there is a distinct three-segmented palp. The maxilla has two endites, the lower is oval to quadrangular, the upper is truncate and has the distal margin with strong spines; there is a single undivided palp. The three maxillipeds all have a well-developed exopod with a multi-articulated flagellum. The epipod is oval. The dactylus is elongate and is attached with one of its longer sides to the propodus. Its carpus is short and the merus more than twice as long as the carpus. The merus is somewhat shorter than the carpus and 3/5 of the length of the ischium. The latter is wider than any of the other segments and its posterodistal end reaches beyond the base of the merus. None of the legs shows a chela (claw). The ischium bears a large movable spine.

Maciolek (1974) described the species as the exoskeleton having a slight red pigmentation, particularly along the midline; with some black pigment associated with its eyes. The species is a pale, slightly purplish pink shrimp with the carapace yellow or whitish by the presence of its internal organs shining through. The carapace has a darker red spot behind the rostrum, and a less distinct one near the middle of the posterior margin. The abdomen is pink with a transverse orange-red band over the first tergite, and a narrow median longitudinal streak on the fourth somite. On its tail fan there are several red spots. The lower surface of the body is uniformly pink, the thorax being brighter than that of the abdomen. The appendages are pale pink or colourless. Other specimens have shown different colour patterns.

Distribution
Procaris hawaiana has been seen in Cape Kinau, and Hawaii Island, in small anchialine pools, cohabitating with Calliasmata species.

Behaviour
According to Maciolek (1974): The animal swims with its legs extended fan-like and symmetrically in a plane below the body. Usually it does so close to the substrate (lava), occasionally in mid-water, and sometimes along the underside of the surface film.

References

External links

Decapods
Fauna of Hawaii
Freshwater crustaceans of North America
ESA endangered species
Crustaceans described in 1973